Karyna Stankova is a Ukrainian wrestler who participated at the 2010 Summer Youth Olympics in Singapore. She won the bronze medal in the girls' freestyle 70 kg event.

References 

Wrestlers at the 2010 Summer Youth Olympics
Ukrainian female sport wrestlers
Living people
Year of birth missing (living people)
21st-century Ukrainian women